Pachycnemia hippocastanaria, the horse chestnut moth, is a moth of the family Geometridae. It is found in most of Europe.

The wingspan is 28–32 mm. Adults are on wing from April to May, and again in a partial second generation in August, usually with fewer and smaller moths.

The larvae feed on common heather (Calluna vulgaris), although both the English and Latin names refer to the horse chestnut tree (Aesculus hippocastanum).

External links
UKmoths
Fauna Europaea
BioLib

Ennomini
Moths described in 1799
Moths of Asia
Moths of Europe
Taxa named by Jacob Hübner